Longoni  may refer to:
 Longoni, one of the most prominent European manufacturers of high-end cue sticks
 Longoni, Mayotte, a village in the commune of Koungou on Mayotte
 Longoni (surname), an Italian surname